GoldenPalace.com is an online casino that operates under a license granted by CIGA (Curaçao Internet Gaming Association). They are known for their publicity stunts and large "bonuses" that had to be wagered up to fifty times before claiming. On several occasions, this led to controversy when the site refused to pay players seen to be only playing to claim the free money, and not for the entertainment value. One key incident led to the site's former software provider, Microgaming, terminating their agreement. This led GoldenPalace and its sister casinos to move to rival Playtech in 2003; since 2013, it uses provider IGSONLINE.

Promotions
The casino has paid many boxers to wear temporary tattoos on their backs promoting the site. GoldenPalace.com has also been accused of far more disruptive ambush marketing stunts. The casino sponsored serial streaker Mark Roberts in several of his escapades, including his "performances" at the 2003 UEFA Cup final and Super Bowl XXXVIII in 2004; at both events, he wore a temporary GoldenPalace.com tattoo. Individuals sporting temporary tattoos for the casino have also disrupted other sporting events, including the 2004 Summer Olympics and the 2006 Winter Olympics. Free climber Alain Robert wore such a tattoo when he climbed the Sydney Harbour Bridge in 2003.

In controversial acts, it sponsored both Roberts (who was fully clothed) and former NBA star Dennis Rodman's participation in the 2004 Running of the Bulls as a fundraiser for multiple sclerosis charities. It has sponsored several competitive eaters and competitive eating competitions, one of which was profiled on the A&E TV show Airline (a grilled cheese sandwich eating contest, likely referring to a sandwich with the image of the Virgin Mary that the casino purchased). It also sponsored the da Vinci Project's attempt to fly a reusable crewed spacecraft for the Ansari X Prize, and was the cash prize sponsor on The Surreal Life: Fame Games.

Bids at Internet auctions
GoldenPalace.com is also well known for its winning internet auctions, mostly for bizarre items. For example:

On July 22, 2004, GoldenPalace won its first bid, buying a David Beckham missed penalty kick ball for €28,050.
On November 23, 2004, the site paid $28,000 for a grilled cheese sandwich purportedly displaying an image of the Virgin Mary.
On March 3, 2005, they paid $650,000 for the naming rights of the recently discovered Madidi titi monkey. The "GoldenPalace.com monkey" was officially named Callicebus aureipalatii, "aureipalatii" literally translating into "Of the golden palace".
On March 30, 2005, the casino paid Terri Iligan $15,199 to change her name to "goldenpalace.com".
On May 5, 2005, it paid €188,938.88 ($244,524.73) to German student Benjamin Halbe for a Volkswagen Golf car which formerly belonged to Cardinal Joseph Ratzinger, now better known as Pope Emeritus Benedict XVI. With over 8.5 million visitors, the auction became the most often viewed auction on eBay.de.
On June 30, 2005, Karolyne Smith sold the right to permanently tattoo their domain name on her forehead for $10,000 or $15,000.
In 2006, it paid $25,000 for William Shatner's kidney stone.

Notes

External links
GoldenPalace.com

Online gambling companies of the Netherlands
Online casinos